In geometry, the decagrammic prism is one of an infinite set of nonconvex prisms formed by squares sides and two regular star polygon caps, in this case two decagrams.

It has 12 faces (10 squares and 2 decagrams), 30 edges, and 20 vertices.

Prismatoid polyhedra